Adolf Manfred Trautschold (27 March 1854–13 December 1921) was a German genre painter and lithographer. He worked in England and then in New Jersey.

Biography

Adolf Manfred Trautschold was born in Giessen, Germany to Wilhelm Trautschold and his British wife Sophia Johnston, an illegitimate daughter of the industrial chemist James Muspratt. His uncle was the palaeontologist Hermann Trautschold. Little is known of his training in art. He married the Belgian Marguerite De Hees, daughter of a merchant, in Dover, Kent on 22 August 1878. They had two sons, Reginald William Trautschold and Gordon Manfred Trautschold.  He contributed a painting to an 1882 book Bedford Park, celebrating the then-fashionable garden suburb of that name. In 1887 the family emigrated to the US, settling in Montclair, New Jersey. The family home became known as an artists' colony.

He died in Queens, New York City.

References 

1854 births
1921 deaths
19th-century German artists